Australia competed at the 2007 World Aquatics Championships in Melbourne, Australia from 17 March to 1 April 2007.

Medalists

Diving

Australia entered a team of seven divers.

Men

Women

Open water swimming

Men

Women

Swimming

Men

Women

 Swimmers who participated in the heats only.

Synchronised swimming

Women

Water polo

Summary

References

World Aquatics Championships
2007
Nations at the 2007 World Aquatics Championships